The 1959 Connecticut Huskies football team represented the University of Connecticut in the 1959 NCAA College Division football season.  The Huskies were led by eighth-year head coach Bob Ingalls, and completed the season with a record of 6–3.

Schedule

References

Connecticut
UConn Huskies football seasons
Yankee Conference football champion seasons
Connecticut Huskies football